The 1982 Nebraska vs. Penn State football game was an NCAA college football game held on September 25, 1982, during the 1982 NCAA Division I-A football season at Beaver Stadium in State College, Pennsylvania, between the then-#2 Nebraska Cornhuskers (coached by Tom Osborne) and then-#8 Penn State Nittany Lions (coached by Joe Paterno).

Lead-up to the game
The host Nittany Lions were ranked #8 in the AP Poll in the week leading up to the game with #2 Nebraska. Both teams were undefeated (Nebraska had beaten Iowa and New Mexico State, while Penn State had defeated rivals Temple, Maryland and Rutgers).

The game

First quarter
Penn State drew first blood in the first quarter on a six-play, 83-yard drive that culminated in a touchdown pass from Todd Blackledge to Kirk Bowman. Massimo Manca's extra point made it 7–0 Penn State.

Second quarter
Penn State scored again in the second quarter, this time on a six-play, 71-yard drive that culminated in a Curt Warner touchdown run from the Nebraska 2. The score was 14–0 Penn State after the extra point by Manca.

Late in the half, Nebraska got on the board after a seven-play, 80-yard drive culminated in a Turner Gill touchdown pass followed by the extra point by Kevin Seibel. The score was 14–7 Penn State at the half.

Third quarter
Penn State scored again in the third quarter, this time on a seven-play, 83-yard drive on a touchdown pass from Blackledge to Kenny Jackson. Manca's third extra point made it 21–7 Penn State.

However, Nebraska scored again, this time on a 15-play, 80-yard drive that resulted in a touchdown to make it 21–14 Penn State after three quarters following Seibel's extra point.

Fourth quarter
Following a fumble by Penn State's backup tailback Skeeter Nichols (replacing Warner, who left the game early in the third quarter with muscle cramps) that was recovered by Nebraska at their own 44 yard line, Nebraska moved to the Penn State 20 before settling for a Seibel field goal to make the score 21–17 Penn State.

Nebraska would take its only lead of the afternoon on an 80-yard drive after intercepting a Blackledge pass in the end zone, leading to a touchdown to make the score 24–21 Nebraska.

Final drive
Penn State returned the ensuing kickoff to their own 20 yard line, but Nebraska's David Ridder was flagged for a personal foul. The fifteen yard penalty saw the final drive start from the Penn State 35.

Blackledge led Penn State down the field to the Nebraska 28, where the drive appeared to have stalled, but on fourth down and 11, Penn State kept the drive alive when Blackledge completed a pass to Jackson for a first down. The next completion ended up being controversial. On second down and four yards to go, Blackledge threw a 15-yard pass to Mike McCloskey.  Replays appeared to show the pass was caught out of bounds, however the linesman ruled him in-bounds. At the time, instant replay could not be used to overturn calls made on the field.  This set up first and goal from the Nebraska 2 yard line with nine seconds remaining on the clock.  Nebraska defensive players thought McCloskey was out of bounds, but without the benefit of instant replay, Penn State took advantage and Blackledge hooked up with Bowman on the winning touchdown pass with 4 seconds left.  It wasn’t certain to Nebraska’s defenders that Bowman made a legal catch of the final pass.   Manca's extra point attempt was no good, so the score was 27–24 Penn State.

Nebraska failed to return the ensuing kickoff past their own 35, making the 27–24 score official in favor of Penn State.

Aftermath
Nebraska dropped to #8 after the loss, but ran the table over the remainder of the season, beginning with a 41-7 rout of Auburn at Jordan-Hare Stadium and ending with a win over #13 LSU in the Orange Bowl.

Penn State moved up to #4 after the win (then to #3 following a bye week), then lost to #5 Alabama to fall back to #8. But they ran the table over the remainder of the regular season, and went on to win their first consensus national championship in the Sugar Bowl by defeating top-ranked Georgia (who were led by Heisman Trophy winner Herschel Walker), 27–23. The win over Nebraska was the signature win of Penn State's first national championship season.

Nebraska would get revenge the next season by defeating Penn State in the inaugural Kickoff Classic at Giants Stadium 44–6.

In 1998, Mike McClosky admitted at a speaking engagement that he was in fact "out of bounds".  Blackledge commented that perhaps the worst call in Nebraska history was a break for the Nittany Lions.  Even Joe Paterno said later that the pass "might have been incomplete".

References

1982 NCAA Division I-A football season
vs. Penn State 1982
vs. Nebraska 1982
September 1982 sports events in the United States
1982 in sports in Pennsylvania